Joachim Schwermer (26 May 1950, Kulmbach) is a German mathematician, specializing in number theory.

Schwermer received his Abitur in 1969 at Aloisiuskolleg in Bad Godesberg and then studied mathematics at the University of Bonn. After graduating in 1974 with his Diplom, he received in 1977 his Promotion (Ph.D.) underi Günter Harder with thesis Eisensteinreihen und die Kohomologie von Kongruenzuntergruppen von . In 1982 he received his Habilitation from the University of Bonn. From 1986 he was a professor at the Catholic University of Eichstätt-Ingolstadt, then at the University of Düsseldorf, and finally in the 2000s at the University of Vienna. During the academic year 1980–1981 Schwermer was a visiting scholar at the Institute for Advanced Study. In 1987 he was awarded the Gay-Lussac-Humboldt-Prize.

Schwermer's research deals with algebraic groups in number theory, arithmetic geometry, Lie groups, and L-functions. He has written essays on the history of mathematics, for example, about Helmut Hasse, Hermann Minkowski, and Emil Artin.

He is now a professor at the University of Vienna as well as the scientific director at the Erwin Schrödinger International Institute for Mathematical Physics.

In June 2016, the Max Planck Institute for Mathematics held a Conference on the Cohomology of Arithmetic Groups on the occasion of Joachim Schwermer's 66th birthday.

Selected publications
 with Della Dumbaugh, Emil Artin and Beyond – Class Field Theory and L-Functions, Heritage of European Mathematics, European Mathematical Society, 2015, 
 with Jens Carsten Jantzen: Algebra, Springer, 2006, 
 Kohomologie arithmetisch definierter Gruppen und Eisensteinreihen, Springer, Lectures Notes in Mathematics Bd.988, 1983, 
 as editor with Jean-Pierre Labesse: Cohomology of arithmetic groups and automorphic forms, Springer, 1990, Lecture Notes in Mathematics (Konferenz Luminy/Marseille 1989), 
 as editor with Catherine Goldstein and Norbert Schappacher: The Shaping of Arithmetic after C. F. Gauss's Disquisitiones Arithmeticae, Springer 2007.
Minkowski, Hensel, and Hasse: On The Beginnings of the Local-Global Principle, in Jeremy Gray, Karen Parshall: Episodes in the history of modern algebra (1800-1950), American Mathematical Society 2007
Über Reziprozitätsgesetze in der Zahlentheorie, in Horst Knörrer (ed.): Arithmetik und Geometrie, Mathematische Miniaturen, vol. 3, Birkhäuser Verlag 1986,

External links

 
 Homepage at the University of Vienna

References

20th-century German mathematicians
21st-century German mathematicians
German historians of mathematics
University of Bonn alumni
Academic staff of Heinrich Heine University Düsseldorf
Academic staff of the University of Vienna
Institute for Advanced Study visiting scholars
1950 births
People from Kulmbach
Living people
Academic staff of the Catholic University of Eichstätt-Ingolstadt